Kuala Lumpur Middle Ring Road 1 or the stretch of roads including Jalan Tun Razak, Lebuhraya Sultan Iskandar (Lebuhraya Mahameru), Jalan Damansara, Jalan Istana and Jalan Lapangan Terbang is an urban and municipal main ring road in Kuala Lumpur. It is also known as Kuala Lumpur–Petaling Jaya Traffic Dispersal Scheme by the Malaysian Public Works Department (JKR). It is a busy ring road during rush hour time. This ring road is maintained by Dewan Bandaraya Kuala Lumpur or Kuala Lumpur City Hall (DBKL).

List of interchanges

References

See also
 Kuala Lumpur Inner Ring Road
 Kuala Lumpur Middle Ring Road 2
 Jalan Tuanku Abdul Halim

Ring roads in Malaysia
Highways in Malaysia
Expressways and highways in the Klang Valley
Roads in Kuala Lumpur